Fieve is a surname. Notable people with the surname include:

Carlos Luis de Ribera y Fieve (1815–1891), Spanish painter
Ronald R. Fieve (1930–2018), American psychiatrist

See also
Fiene
Fievez